Frédéric Danjou (born 28 September 1974 in Clamart) is a French former professional footballer who played as a defender.

References

External links 
 
 
 

1974 births
Living people
People from Clamart
French footballers
Association football defenders
Ligue 1 players
Ligue 2 players
AJ Auxerre players
La Liga players
Real Oviedo players
ES Troyes AC players
AC Ajaccio players
Stade Malherbe Caen players
US Créteil-Lusitanos players
Gazélec Ajaccio players
French expatriate footballers
French expatriate sportspeople in Spain
Expatriate footballers in Spain
Footballers from Hauts-de-Seine